Gecarcoidea is genus of terrestrial crabs. The crabs live in forests but must come to the coast to breed. When it is dry in the summer the crabs are inactive, but when it is the wet season they are ready to migrate.

Two species are recognised:

References

External links 

 
 

Grapsoidea
Terrestrial crustaceans